Mikhail L'vovich Lidov (4 October 1926–30 December 1993) was a Soviet and Russian astronomer specialising in celestial mechanics. He is best known for discovering, simultaneously with Yoshihide Kozai, the Kozai-Lidov mechanism.

In 1960, he was awarded the Lenin prize for his contributions to the Soviet space program.

The asteroid 4236 Lidov, discovered by Nikolai Chernykh in 1979, was named in his honour. The official naming citation was published by the Minor Planet Center on 1 September 1993.

References 
 

1926 births
1993 deaths
Russian astronomers
Soviet astronomers
Moscow State University alumni